The Chaetothyriales are an order of ascomycetous fungi in the class Eurotiomycetes and within the subclass Chaetothyriomycetidae. The order was circumscribed in 1987 by mycologist Margaret Elizabeth Barr-Bigelow.

Families and genera
, Species Fungorum includes 9 families, 97 genera, and 691 species in the Chaetothyriales. The following list shows the families, genera, and number of species in the Chaetothyriales, adapted from a recent (2020) taxonomic and nomenclatural review of the order.
Chaetothyriaceae 

Actinocymbe – 3 spp.
Aithaloderma – 12 spp.
Aphanophora – 1 sp.
Arthrophiala – 1 sp.
Camptophora – 2 spp.
Ceramothyrium – 39 spp.
Ceratocarpia – 3 spp.
Chaetothyriomyces – 1 sp.
Chaetothyrium – 67 spp.
Cyphellophoriella – 1 sp.
Euceramia – 3 spp.
Longihyalospora – 2 spp.
Microcallis – 9spp.
Nullicamyces – 1 sp.
Phaeosaccardinula – 41 spp.
Stanhughesia – 4 sp.
Treubiomyces – 7 spp.
Vonarxia – 2 spp.
Yatesula – 2 spp.

Coccodiniaceae 
Coccodinium – 4 spp.
Dennisiella – 9 spp.
Limacinula – 17 spp.

Cyphellophoraceae 
Anthopsis – 3 spp.
Cyphellophora – 25 spp.

Epibryaceae 
Epibryon – 47 spp.

Herpotrichiellaceae 
Aculeata – 1 sp.
Atrokylindriopsis – 1 sp.
Brycekendrickomyces – 1 sp.
Capronia – ca. 81 spp.
Cladophialophora – 41 spp.
Exophiala – 59 spp.
Fonsecaea – 16 spp.
Marinophialophora – 1 sp.
Melanoctona – 1 sp.
Metulocladosporiella – 6 spp.
Minimelanolocus – 34 spp.
Phialophora – 7 spp.
Pleomelogramma – 2 spp.
Rhinocladiella – 21 spp.
Sorocybe – 3 spp.
Thysanorea – 14 spp.
Veronaea – 20 spp.

Lyrommataceae 
Lyromma – 7 spp.

Microtheliopsidaceae 
Microtheliopsis – 4 spp.

Paracladophialophoraceae 
Paracladophialophora – 2 spp.

Pyrenotrichaceae 
Pyrenothrix – 2 spp.
Neophaeococcomyces – 4 spp.

Trichomeriaceae 
Arthrocladium – 4 spp.
Bacillicladium – 1 sp.
Bradymyces – 3 spp.
Knufia – 14 spp.
Lithohypha – 1 sp.
Neostrelitziana – 1 sp.
Strelitziana – 8 spp.
Trichomerium – 36 spp.

Genera incertae sedis
Several genera have been included in the Chaetothyriales although their familial placement is unknown. These include:
Lichenodiplis  – 13 spp.
Lichenodiplisiella  – 1 sp.
Melnikomyces  – 1 sp.
Minutoexcipula  – 7 spp.
Muellerella  – 14 spp.
Pleostigma  – 9 spp.
Sarcinomyces  – 5 spp.
Uncispora  – 3 spp.

References

Eurotiomycetes
Ascomycota orders
Lichen orders
Taxa described in 1987
Taxa named by Margaret Elizabeth Barr-Bigelow